The Imperial Order of Dom Pedro I is a Brazilian order of chivalry instituted by Emperor Pedro I of Brazil on 16 April 1826. It is considered by many numismatists as the rarest of the Brazilian imperial orders.

On 22 March 1890, the order was cancelled as national order by the interim government of United States of Brazil. Since the deposition in 1889 of the last Brazilian monarch, Emperor Pedro II, the order continues as a house order being awarded by the Heads of the House of Orleans-Braganza, pretenders to the defunct throne of Brazil. The current Brazilian Imperial Family is split into two branches Petrópolis and Vassouras, and the Grand Mastership of the Order is disputed between those two branches.

History
Created by a short decree of 16 April 1826, the order initially consisted of one grade and was only awarded to reigning monarchs. It was only regularized by Decree No. 228 of 19 October 1842, which would finally establish its degrees, number of holders and establish the design of the insignia. In that time, it was characterized as a strictly personal award of Emperor Pedro I, its grand master, which awarded only one person: his father-in-law Francis II, Holy Roman Emperor. It was Emperor Pedro II who most distributed the order, being, nevertheless, the Brazilian order that had fewer holders.

It would be intended for both nationals and foreigners, who, as well as members of the Imperial Family (who were Grand Crosses of the Order from birth), would not need to take oath or respect the maximum number of members of each degree.

Despite what some sources cite, the creator of the project was not Jean-Baptiste Debret, so he himself does not know how to accurately describe the insignia in his Voyage pittoresque.

Characteristics
Many authors point out the similarities of this with the insignia of the French Order of the Iron Crown

Insignia
Grand cross
Obverse: topped by imperial crown, winged dragon, in reference to the House of Braganza, red sole and out of crown (old), garnished with fruity coffee branches and topped with green ribbon with gold inscription Founder of the Empire of Brazil. The dragon carries a green and gold shield with the inscription P.I. The crown of the city, enamelled with white and gold-plated, does not appear on the posterior insignia, and the dragon is completed with its tail.
Reverse: equal, differentiating itself by the legend inscribed in the shield: now To the recognition of the Empire of Brazil ora 16-4-1826.

Tape and band 
Green in color with white borders.

Degrees
Grand Cross (styled "Excellency" and limited to 12 recipients)
Commander ( styled "Senhor" and limited to 40 recipients)
Knight (limited to 100 recipients)

Recipients 

Officially, Luís Alves de Lima e Silva, Duke of Caxias was the only Brazilian awarded the commendation. There are discussions as to whether Felisberto Caldeira Brant, the Marquis of Barbacena, would have been honored as a knight or great cross. It is supposed, however, that it is a confusion, for the Marquis of Barbacena was in fact the bearer of the Grand Cross granted to Francis I of Austria, the latter being the first to be awarded. From what can be found in official records, only this holders of the Order are considered:

  Alexander III of Russia
  Prince Louis, Duke of Nemours
  Prince Gaston, Count of Eu
  Francis II of the Two Sicilies
  Princess Maria di Grazia of Bourbon-Two Sicilies
  Francis II, Holy Roman Emperor
  Leopold II of Belgium
  Victoria of the United Kingdom

References

Literature
 Poliano, Luís Marques. Heráldica. Ed. GRD. Rio de Janeiro, 1986.
 Poliano, Luís Marques. Ordens honoríficas do Brasil.

Pedro I, Order of
1826 establishments in Brazil
Awards established in 1826
Orders of chivalry awarded to heads of state, consorts and sovereign family members